Doug Woodlief (born September 4, 1943) is a former American football linebacker. He played for the Los Angeles Rams from 1965 to 1969.

References

1943 births
Living people
American football linebackers
Memphis Tigers football players
Los Angeles Rams players
Calgary Stampeders players